Bigga is a village in the Southern Tablelands of New South Wales, Australia, in Upper Lachlan Shire. It is in the Parish of Bigga, County of Georgiana. The name Bigga is thought to originate as a shortened version of the Biggs Grant. Bigga is on the western side of the Abercrombie Mountains. It is 91 km northwest of Goulburn and 52 km southeast of Cowra. Nearby towns are: Abercrombie River, Binda, Greenmantle, Grabine, Reids Flat, and Tuena. Nearby places are: Blanket Flat and Crooked Corner. These places were once towns.

Bigga is noted for producing some of the world's finest superfine wool.

The earliest explorer into the Bigga area was James Meehan who passed through in April 1820, travelling from Mount McDonald to Bathurst, via what was then called the Fish River, but today is known as the Lachlan River. Sandy Creek was one of the first fine wool farms in the district. During the 1850s there was a land boom and numerous families added to the three original families of the area: the McGuinesses, Blackmans and the Hearnes.

On Christmas day 1861 bushranger John Peisley shot local innkeeper William Benyon who would die from his wounds seven days later. Peisley was arrested four weeks later and hanged at Bathurst in  April 1862. Peisley was a founding member of Frank Gardiner's gang.

After this the area again did not attract new settlers until the 1880s. Bigga village was proclaimed in 1892. In May 1896 a Bigga and Blanket Flat progress association was formed.

Population 

External links
Bigga Public School

References

Upper Lachlan Shire
Towns in New South Wales
Southern Tablelands